This is a list of mountains in the U.S. state of Maryland.

By mountain range
This list is arranged by mountain ranges.

Ridge-and-Valley Appalachians
Listed alphabetically by county

Garrett County
Backbone Mountain (3,360 ft.)
Hoye-Crest
Blossom Hill (2,620 ft.)
Contrary Knob (2,680 ft.)
Conway Hill (2,760 ft.)
Dung Hill (2,732 ft.)
Elder Hill (2,826 ft.)
Fort Hill (2,600 ft.)
George Mountain (3,004 ft.)
Lewis Knob (2,960 ft.)
Little Mountain (2,920 ft.)
Marsh Hill (3,073 ft.)
Mount Nebo (2,604 ft.)
Negro Mountain (3,075 ft.)
Pine Hill (2,500 ft.)
Rich Hill (2,842 ft.)
Ridgley Hill (2,617 ft.)
River Hill (2,700 ft.)
Roman Nose Mountain (3,140 ft.)
Roth Rock Mountain (2,860 ft.)
Salt Block Mountain (2,707 ft.)
Savage Mountain (2,870 ft.)
Meadow Mountain (2,959 ft.)
Elbow Mountain (2,730 ft.)
Little Savage Mountain (2,818 ft.)
Mount Aetna (2,598 ft.)
High Rock (2,986 ft.)
Big Savage Mountain (2,982 ft.)
Snaggy Hill (3,040 ft.)
Walnut Hill (2,629 ft.)
Winding Ridge (2,775 ft.)
Whites Knob (2,940 ft.)
Zehner Hill (3,000 ft.)

Allegany County
Breakneck Hill (1,872 ft.)
Collier Mountain (1,460 ft.)
Dans Mountain (2,898 ft.)
Evitts Mountain (1,959-2,260 ft.)
Haystack Mountain (1,706 ft.)
Martin Mountain (1,974 ft.)
Nicholas Mountain (1,760 ft.)
Polish Mountain (1,783 ft.)
Ragged Mountain (1,740 ft.)
Town Hill (2,039 ft.)
Warrior Mountain (2,185 ft.)
Wills Mountain (1,960+ ft.)

Washington County
Roundtop Hill (1,388 ft.)
Sideling Hill (1,760 ft.)
Tonoloway Ridge (1,220 ft.)

Bear Pond Mountains
Abe Mills Mountain (1,360 ft.)
Boyd Mountain (980 ft.)
Bullskin Mountain (1,530 ft.)
Fairview Mountain (1,690 ft.)
Hearthstone Mountain (2,021 ft.)
Johnson Mountain (1,120 ft.)
Rickard Mountain (1,480 ft.)
Powell Mountain (1,548 ft.)
Sword Mountain (1,530+ ft.)

Blue Ridge Mountains

South Mountain
Bartman Hill, (1,400 ft.)
Buzzard Knob, (1,520 ft.)
Lambs Knoll, (1,758 ft.)
Monument Knob, (1,540 ft.)
Pine Knob, (1,714 ft.)
Quirauk Mountain, (2,150 ft.)
Short Hill (1,080 ft.)

Catoctin Mountain
Bob's Hill (1,747 ft.)
Carrick Knob (1,629 ft.)
Cascade Miller Hill (1,374 ft.)
Catoctin Summit (1,910 ft.)
Eagle Mountain (1,680 ft.)
High Knob (1,531 ft.)
Little Piney Mountain (1,304 ft.)
Piney Mountain (1,691 ft.)
Pine Rock (1,200 ft)
Point of Rocks (680 ft)
Round Top Mountain (1,702 ft.)

Elk Ridge
Maryland Heights (1,460 ft.)
Elk Ridge Summit (1,476 ft.)

Foot Hills
Red Hill (1,020 ft)
Hawks Hill (930 ft)

Monadnocks
Sugarloaf Mountain(1,282 ft.)
Bud Hill (1,000 ft.)

Weird Mountain

See also 
List of mountains of the Appalachians

Mountains
Maryland
Maryland